William Francis Rhea (April 20, 1858 – March 23, 1931) was a U.S. Representative from Virginia, a Virginia state court judge, and a member of the Virginia State Corporation Commission.

Biography
Born on a farm near Bristol, Virginia in Washington County, Rhea attended rural and private schools. He graduated from King College in Bristol, Tennessee, in 1878, studied law and was admitted to the bar in 1879 and commenced practice in Bristol, Virginia.
He served as judge of the county court for Washington County in the years 1880–1885.
He served as member of the Senate of Virginia in the years 1885–1888.
He served as judge of the Corporation Court for the City of Bristol, Virginia.
He resigned in 1895 and resumed the practice of law.

Rhea was elected as a Democrat to the Fifty-sixth and Fifty-seventh Congresses (March 4, 1899 – March 3, 1903), defeating James A. Walker, the previous incumbent. Walker contested the result of both elections. At a deposition related to the 1898, a shootout occurred, and Walker was wounded. The contest of the 1900 election ended on the death of Walker in 1901.

Rhea was an unsuccessful candidate for reelection in 1902 to the Fifty-eighth Congress, losing to the Republican Campbell Slemp, and resumed the practice of law in Bristol, Virginia. He moved to Richmond, Virginia, when appointed a member of the State Corporation Commission in 1908 and served until 1925. Rhea made his home in Richmond across the street from the Robert E. Lee camp for confederate veterans; the house built in 1922 on Grove Avenue is now the "Museum District Bed and Breakfast," near the Virginia Museum of Fine Arts.

Rhea died in Richmond on March 23, 1931. He was interred in Hollywood Cemetery.

Sources

External links
 
 A Guide to the William Francis Rhea Papers, 1899-1902, Library of Virginia
 A Guide to the Papers of William Francis Rhea 1899-1902, University of Virginia
 Museum District B & B, About Us

1858 births
1931 deaths
Burials at Hollywood Cemetery (Richmond, Virginia)
Virginia lawyers
Virginia state court judges
Democratic Party members of the United States House of Representatives from Virginia
People from Bristol, Virginia